John Hitchmough may refer to:

 John Hitchmough (cricketer, born 1958), former English cricketer
 John Hitchmough (cricketer, born 1962), former English cricketer